The Conflict Intelligence Team (CIT) is an independent investigative organisation originating from Russia that conducts an open-source investigation of events taking place during armed conflicts, in particular, the actions of Russian troops in Ukraine, Syria, Libya and Central African Republic. Together with Bellingcat and InformNapalm, it is one of the largest such groups that emerged during the Russo-Ukrainian War.

History 
The group was founded by Ruslan Leviev, a programmer from Surgut (Russia). According to him, in 2011 he noticed massive fraud in the elections to the State Duma, after which he joined actions of the Russian opposition and created a company performing online broadcasts of various actions, in particular, Euromaidan. After the annexation of Crimea by Russia and the start of the war in Donbas, Leviev began to cover and investigate the events in these conflicts, including participation of the Russian military in them. At first, his group was called War in Ukraine (WiU), and in September 2015, after the start of Russian military intervention in Syria, it changed its name to the current one. In comparison to the other similar groups, CIT is distinguished by small number of participants (6 people) and the fact that they are all citizens of Russia. The names of most members of the group are kept in secret for security reasons.

Until 2022, the group operated mainly in Russia and faced threats that included two attempts to initiate a criminal case against Leviev, a summons to the military prosecutor's office, an attack by an unknown person, phone calls with death threats, and a hacker attack by the CyberBerkut group.

On March 5, 2022, CIT announced that it had left Russia in order to be able to continue working. In May, Leviev was charged in exile for Violating the March 'fake news' law, which was criticized by the Committee to Protect Journalists.

Activity 
The group collaborates with major global media that publish its investigations, including the BBC, Reuters, Sky News and Der Spiegel.

CIT has carried out a number of internationally recognized investigations into the presence and activities of Russian troops in Syria and Ukraine, in particular the deaths of Russian soldiers in these countries and Russia's use of cluster munition in Syria. Clear evidence of its use (denied by the Russian authorities) was found in photos and videos from Russian state media. 
By examining photographs and maps, the CIT also disproved the official Russian thesis that Russian troops in Syria did not participate in ground battles.

Together with Bellingcat, the group studied the circumstances of the Boeing 777 shoot-down in the Donetsk region in 2014.

CIT clarified the biography details of the suspects in the poisoning of Sergei and Yulia Skripal in 2018, and in 2020 investigated the murder of Alexander Taraikovsky, a participant in Belarusian protests.

The group informed in detail about Russia's preparations for invasion of Ukraine in 2022.

References

External links
 
 Conflict Intelligence Team on Twitter

Open-source intelligence
Citizen journalism
Investigative journalism
Russian journalism organizations